Asia Pacific Week (APW) is an annual conference held at the Australian National University (ANU) and hosted by the ANU College of Asia & the Pacific. The conference brings together 80 of the 'best and brightest' delegates from around the world to engage in discussion on the future of the Asia Pacific region. Through the incorporation of innovative and trans-disciplinary panels, workshops and social events, APW aims are to facilitate communication and forge connections between leading scholars, policy makers and delegates.

Topics

The Conference 

A long-established tradition at the ANU, APW was reinvigorated in 2011 with the introduction of a student organising committee. The conference is a student-run, non-profit initiative that affords high achieving students the opportunity to explore and debate the issues affecting the Asia Pacific region, in concert with leading academics, scholars and policy makers.

Delegates are selected on the basis of their interests, passions and engagements with Asia Pacific affairs.

The conference is divided into a number of sessions that focues on different issues affecting the Asia Pacific region. A number of notable academics and policy makers are involved with APW including Peter Drysdale, Zhao Jianfei, Stephen Howes, The Honourable Gareth Evans AO QC and Admiral Chris Barrie AC.

Asia Pacific Week culminates in a Gala dinner, and previous Guests of Honour have included former Prime Ministers The Honourable Bob Hawke AC GCL and The Right Honourable Malcolm Fraser AC CH GCL PC, as well as former Minister for Foreign Affairs Bob Carr.

References

External links 
 Asia Pacific Week Official Website
 Transcript of Malcolm Fraser's Address at the 2011 APW Gala Dinner
 ABC's broadcast of the 2012 Q & Asia Session
 A former delegate's perspective on APW 2012

Australian National University